Susan Stultz is a Canadian politician, who was elected to the Legislative Assembly of New Brunswick in the 2010 provincial election. She represented the electoral district of Moncton West as a member of the Progressive Conservatives until the 2014 election, when she was defeated by Cathy Rogers.

Election results

2010 Election

References
 

Progressive Conservative Party of New Brunswick MLAs
Women MLAs in New Brunswick
People from Moncton
Living people
Members of the Executive Council of New Brunswick
21st-century Canadian politicians
21st-century Canadian women politicians
Women government ministers of Canada
Year of birth missing (living people)